The Airport Transit System (ATS) is an automated people mover system at Chicago O'Hare International Airport. It opened on May 6, 1993. The ATS moves passengers between the airport terminals and parking facilities, and was designed to operate 24 hours a day, 7 days a week. The system was closed for refurbishment and modernization between January 2019 and November 2021, and reopened on November 3, 2021.

History

Planning and construction 

In 1982, O'Hare officials unveiled the O'Hare Development Plan, a plan to expand the airport with a new international terminal (now called Terminal 5), and an expansion of the domestic terminals. The new international terminal, located away from the domestic terminals, necessitated the creation of a people mover to allow for connections between domestic and international flights. The system was also intended to provide connections to distant parking facilities. The City of Chicago first awarded the contract for the people mover system to Westinghouse Electric, the second lowest bidder, in 1985. After simplifying their initial proposal in response to concerns from City, the contract was re-awarded to low bidder Matra. Ground was broken in 1987 by Mayor Harold Washington, who also died that year. The system ultimately opened in May 1993.

Modernization and extension 
As part of a larger, $800 million project involving a new integrated transit center, the ATS began a modernization project in 2018. The expansion included replacing the existing 15-car fleet with 36 new Bombardier Innovia APM 256 vehicles, upgrading the previous infrastructure, and extending the line  to the new Multi-Modal Facility on the east side of U.S. 12–45 (Mannheim Road). Previously, the line ended at Remote Parking. The system closed in January 2019 for construction and testing of the planned modernization, with airport-funded shuttle buses running in public trafficways servicing the destinations previously serviced by the ATS. Originally, the ATS was to reopen by Fall of 2019, but this was delayed several times due in part to the COVID-19 pandemic, contract disputes, and reliability. The Chicago Department of Aviation reopened the system in November 2021 with a limited schedule. The system returned to 24 hour service in April 2022.

Service 
The Airport Transit System operates 24 hours a day, 7 days a week. The system is free to users and connects O'Hare's terminals to parking lots, and the consolidated rental car facility.

The system is in a "pinched-loop" configuration, which allows more than one train to travel along a track at once while providing service in both directions. The entire system uses platform screen doors, which means that all the stations were enclosed with doors along the boarding area. When the train arrives at a station, the doors of the train and the station align and open in sync with each other. This method prevents people from leaving the platform, falling on the tracks or tampering with restricted areas.

The system's 36 cars are joined into 3-car trains, with each train able to carry up to 147 passengers.

Stations 
ATS stations are fully accessible and provide access to the elevated ATS tracks. The system has two tracks, and each train stops at all five stations traveling in both directions. Its west end is at Terminal 1, at the west end of the terminal core, and it makes a counterclockwise loop around the parking garage with stops at Terminal 2 and Terminal 3. Parking Garage A (the main garage) is accessible from any of the three terminal stations, as is the O'Hare terminal of the CTA's Blue Line. Parking Lots B and C are only accessible from Terminal 1 and 3 stations, respectively. It takes 10 minutes to travel from Terminal 1 to the consolidated rental car facility.
 
Outside the terminal loop, the ATS travels east to Terminal 5, the airport's international terminal. It then turns north, crosses over the main access road and Blue Line, and crosses Mannheim Road to reach the consolidated rental car facility, which is the terminal for Pace bus routes 250 and 330. The facility also connects with the  station on Metra's North Central Service, providing commuter rail service to Chicago Union Station inbound and  outbound during service hours. Currently, the Metra station is open on weekdays only.

Fleet 

The ATS used the French-based VAL technology, which features fully automated, rubber-tired people mover cars.

References

External links 
 
 Official web page

Airport people mover systems in the United States
Transportation in Chicago
VAL people movers
O'Hare International Airport
Railway lines opened in 1993
Railway lines closed in 2019
Railway lines opened in 2021
1993 establishments in Illinois
2019 disestablishments in Illinois
2021 establishments in Illinois